Otto II generally refers to Otto II, Holy Roman Emperor. It may also refer to:

Otto II may also refer to:

Otto II, Duke of Saxony (912–973), also known as Otto the Great and Otto I (as Holy Roman Emperor)
Otto II, Duke of Swabia (died 1047), member of the Ezzonid dynasty
Otto II, Marquess of Montferrat (died 1084), a member of the Aleramid dynasty
Otto II, Count of Habsburg (died 1111), one of the founding members of the Habsburg family
Otto II, Count of Scheyern (died 1120), son of Otto I, House of Wittelsbach
Otto II, Count of Chiny (1065–c, 1131), son of Arnold I and Adélaïs
Otto II, Count of Duras (died 1147), son of Giselbert II and Gertrud
Otto II, Margrave of Meissen (1125–1190), member of the House of Wettin
Otto II, Count of Guelders (13th century), son of Gerard III and Margaretha of Brabant
Otto II, Margrave of Brandenburg (died 1205), called The Generous (German: der Freigiebige)
Otto II (bishop of Freising) (died 1220), 24th Bishop of Freising from 1184
Otto II, Count of Burgundy (c. 1180–1234), also known as Otto I, Duke of Merania
Otto II of Andechs and Merania (1208–1248), a member of the House of Andechs
Otto II, Duke of Bavaria (1206–1253), son of Ludwig I and Ludmilla of Bohemia, and a member of the Wittelsbach dynasty
Otto II, Count of Zutphen (12th century), son of Gottschalk, Count of Zutphen and Adelheid of Zutphen
Otto II, Prince of Anhalt-Aschersleben (died 1315), German prince of the House of Ascania
Otto II, Duke of Brunswick-Lüneburg (1260s–1330), House of Welf and Prince of Lüneburg, 1277–1330
Otto II, Count of Waldeck (died 1369), Count of Waldeck, 1344–1369
Otto II, Count of Rietberg (died 1389), ruling Count of Rietberg, 1365–1389
Otto II, Duke of Pomerania (1380s–1428), Duke of Pomerania-Stettin from the House of Griffins
Otto II, Duke of Brunswick-Osterode (1396–1452), son of Duke Frederick I of Brunswick-Osterode and Adelaide of Anhalt-Zerbst
Otto II, Duke of Brunswick-Göttingen (1380s–1463), member of the House of Welf,
Otto II, Count Palatine of Mosbach-Neumarkt (1435–1499), the Count Palatine of Mosbach-Neumarkt, 1461–1499
Otto II, Duke of Brunswick-Harburg (1528–1603), nicknamed the Younger
Otto II of Hungary (1912–2011), the last Crown Prince of Austria-Hungary, 1916–1919

See also
 Otto fuel II, a monopropellant used to drive torpedoes and other weapon systems
 Otto I (disambiguation)
 Otto III (disambiguation)
 Otto IV (disambiguation)
 Otto VII (disambiguation)
 Otto VIII (disambiguation)